Beaudin is a surname. Notable people with the surname include:

 Jean Beaudin (born 1939, Canadian film director and screenwriter
 Josée Beaudin (born 1961), Canadian politician
 Nicolas Beaudin (born 1999), Canadian ice hockey defender
 Norm Beaudin (born 1941), Canadian ice hockey forward

See also
 Beaudoin

French-language surnames